Jig-A-Loo is a silicone-based lubricant and water-repellent spray. The manufacturer states that it contains no oil, grease, wax, petroleum distillates or detergent and that it doesn't stain or smell after application. It is indicated for use on wood, metal, glass, rubber, leather, fabrics and most plastics. It has been used in the commercial and industrial sectors in Canada since 1958, and was launched in 1998 to the Canadian mass retail market, and globally in 2007.

Jig-A-Loo contains silicone, 30-60% methylene chloride and 10-30% perchloroethylene Methylene chloride is the active ingredient in many paint strippers and perchloroethylene is the most common dry cleaning fluid. They are both aggressive and toxic chlorinated solvents. Although the manufacturer emphasizes the lack of petroleum distillates, these chlorinated solvents are more toxic than the petroleum solvent heptane, which is commonly used as solvent for US market silicone lubricants. OSHA allows much lower permissible exposure level for these chlorinated solvents compared to heptane.

100PPM TWA Tetrachloroethylene
25PPM TWA Methylene Chloride

For comparison permissible exposure level of heptane is much higher at 500PPM TWA.

TWA is an 8 hour time weighed average exposure level deemed to be safe by US OSHA.

For environmental and health safety reasons, the State of California has banned the use of perchloroethylene and methylene chloride in multi-purpose lubricants such as Jig-A-Loo Dec 31, 2010 and the sale of remaining inventory will be banned effective Dec 31, 2013.

Uses 
Some uses recommended from the manufacturer:
Lubricating door hinges, beds and shower curtains to eliminate squeaks
Loosening rusty nuts and screws
Preventing rust on gardening tools, aluminum window frames and plumbing materials
Lubricating candle holders prior to burning to make wax removal easier
Preventing moving parts from freezing
Shining and protecting mag wheels and rubber seals
Cleaning and protecting leather goods
Repelling water on tent, shoes, boots, backpacks and jackets
Lubricating Rubiks cubes and other twisting Puzzles
Cleaning burnt oil from exhaust pipes on motorcycles
Cleans and protects cables and connectors

References

External links 
Jig-A-Loo Official Homepage

Non-petroleum based lubricants
Brand name materials